Aday  is a surname. Notable people with the name include:

 Amanda Aday (born 1981), American stage actor
 Michael Lee Aday or Meat Loaf (1947–2022), American singer
 Pearl Aday (born 1975), American female singer, daughter of Meat Loaf